Živilė Pinskuvienė (née Gudonytė) (born 21 February 1975) is a Lithuanian politician, who was the leader of the Labour Party from 2016 to 2017.

References 

1975 births
Living people
Labour Party (Lithuania) politicians
21st-century Lithuanian politicians
21st-century Lithuanian women politicians